Filipe Gonçalves dos Santos (born 31 January 1998), commonly known as Filipe, is a Brazilian footballer who last played for Corinthians as a goalkeeper.

Career statistics

Club

References

1998 births
Living people
Brazilian footballers
Association football goalkeepers
Sport Club Corinthians Paulista players
Paraná Clube players
Footballers from Rio de Janeiro (city)